The 2008 Henley by-election to elect a member of the House of Commons for the constituency of Henley in Oxfordshire was held on 26 June 2008. It followed the election of Boris Johnson as Mayor of London in May 2008. In order to resign from being an MP, Johnson accepted the post of Steward and Bailiff of the Manor of Northstead on 4 June 2008.

The election was won comfortably by the Conservative candidate John Howell with an increased percentage of the popular vote. The governing Labour Party's vote fell by 11% and they finished fifth, losing their deposit.

Background
Henley was considered a safe seat for the Conservative Party—having been held by the party continuously since 1910 up to this election. Johnson had gained a 12,793 majority from the Liberal Democrats at the previous election, though recent local elections have seen the Liberal Democrats' vote rise. Despite this, an easy win for the Conservative Party candidate was predicted, with the Labour Party being given little to no chance of victory. It had been expected that the by-election would be held after the parliamentary summer recess. However, following their victory in the Crewe and Nantwich by-election, the Conservatives took the opportunity to bring the by-election forward to 26 June, in order to capitalise on their strong support.

Candidates
For the 2010 general election, candidates had been chosen for the Labour and Liberal Democrat parties, but internal party rules may have required re-selection before any by-election was called.

Boris Johnson's father Stanley Johnson was widely expected to seek the Conservative Party's nomination. However, John Howell, an Oxfordshire county councillor, was selected as the Conservative candidate, in preference to Ann Ducker, leader of South Oxfordshire district council, and John Cotton, a South Oxfordshire district councillor.

The Liberal Democrats' candidate was Stephen Kearney, head of a development charity and previously owned and ran a small business. The Liberal Democrats had previously selected Oxfordshire councillor Susan Cooper for the general election, but under Liberal Democrat policies, such selections are not valid for by-elections.  When it became apparent a by-election was to be held, a new selection process was run and she was replaced by Kearney.

The Labour candidate was Richard McKenzie, who was previously a local councillor in Reading, having lost his seat in the local council elections of May 2008.

The Green Party continued with its 2005 general election candidate Mark Stevenson.

The British National Party candidate, Tim Rait, previously stood for European Parliament election in 2004, for Maidenhead in the 2005 general election and the Lothians Region in the 2007 Scottish election.

The UK Independence Party selected Chris Adams, Buckinghamshire County Organiser for the UKIP and also PPC for Aylesbury. He previously stood in Aylesbury at the 2005 general election.

Following the candidature of the then-Miss Great Britain, Gemma Garrett, at the Crewe and Nantwich by-election in 2008, the "Beauties for Britain" group stood two candidates - one blonde, the other brunette - in Henley: Amanda Harrington and Louise Cole, respectively. However, the party was not registered with the Electoral Commission so they were considered Independent candidates.

The Monster Raving Loony Party fielded candidate Bananaman Owen, whose name was taken from a British television programme. The Harry Bear candidate is the fictional creation of Mail on Sunday columnist Richard Heller.

Election result 
Polling day was Thursday 26 June. The results were declared shortly after 0130 BST on Friday 27 June by the returning officer for South Oxfordshire council.

General election 2005 result

Campaign
The nature of campaign was seen as quite aggressive from both sides.  The Liberal Democrats attacked both the green-belt credentials of the Conservative candidate and his participation in the campaign to save the local hospital, as well as producing leaflets which were alleged to imply that the previous MP, Boris Johnson backed their candidate and incorrectly asserting a local school's budget was under threat. The Conservatives in return threatened to sue, claiming the allegations of non-involvement were untrue and played on the fact that the Liberal Democrat candidate was not local, but from Plymouth. The Lib Dems responded by saying that their candidate had moved into the constituency and would remain there, the same way the former Conservative MP Boris Johnson had done when he ran.

Reaction from voters to the hard campaigning indicated that some constituents were turned off and some commentators raised questions on the effectiveness of the Liberal Democrat campaign after the results which saw an increased swing to the Conservatives.

See also
List of United Kingdom by-elections (1979–2010)
1932 Henley by-election
1917 Henley by-election

References

External links
 Election leaflets from the by-election campaign

2008 elections in the United Kingdom
By-elections to the Parliament of the United Kingdom in Oxfordshire constituencies
Henley-on-Thames
2008 in England
2000s in Oxfordshire
Boris Johnson